Holy Trinity Church is a former Anglican, and now Greek Orthodox, church in North Hobart, Tasmania.

Holy Trinity has the oldest peal of bells of its type outside England.

The church was designed in the Gothic Revival style by James Blackburn and consecrated in 1849. Rev. Philip Palmer was its first rector.

In February 2007, a property assessment report found that more than $5 million was needed to restore the church building, and that it was unrealistic for the parish to continue maintaining all its properties. The following month, the parish council petitioned the Bishop of Tasmania, Rt. Rev. John Harrower, to deconsecrate the building. In August the decision to close the church was communicated to the congregation, and the final service was held on 28 October 2007.

The Holy Trinity Church Charitable Trust was formed in November 2007 in an effort to preserve the building. The Trust asked the Anglican Church to transfer the property to them, but it was instead sold to the Greek Orthodox Archdiocese of Australia. , extensive repairs had started on the church.

References

External links
On The Convict Trail: Holy Trinity Church, Hobart

Churches in Hobart
Gothic Revival architecture in Hobart
Anglican churches in Tasmania
1849 establishments in Australia
19th-century Anglican church buildings
Gothic Revival church buildings in Australia
Greek Orthodox churches in Australia
North Hobart, Tasmania